Ida Gertrude Eise  (9 September 1891 – 7 March 1978) was a New Zealand artist and art teacher. She was born in Auckland, New Zealand, on 9 September 1891. She was a student of Edward Fristrom and painted in an impressionistic style. She taught at the Elam School of Fine Arts and New Plymouth Technical College. As an artist, she was known as an interpreter of the Northland outdoors. Her awards included the Bledisloe Medal in 1936 and 1949. Her works are held in the Auckland Art Gallery and in the Museum of New Zealand Te Papa Tongarewa.

In the 1976 Queen's Birthday Honours, Eise was appointed a Member of the Order of the British Empire, for services to art.

Further reading 
Anne Kirker, New Zealand Women Artists: A Survey of 150 Years (1986, Craftsman House)

References

1891 births
1978 deaths
New Zealand artists
New Zealand educators
People from Auckland
New Zealand art teachers
New Zealand Members of the Order of the British Empire
People associated with the Rutland Group
Elam Art School alumni
University of Auckland alumni